Lycée Fabert is a senior high school in Metz, Moselle department, Lorraine, France. The school, in the city centre, was the first lycée in Metz.

Facility
The high school consists of several buildings. They include:
 The old lycée called "l'abbaye" - It is the former convent abbey of St. Vincent - It includes the headmaster offices, the staff offices, the library, and the cloister (cloître)
 The "petit lycée" (Small lycée) - Built in 1845
 The refectory - Built in 2003
 St. Constance Building
 Alexis de Tocqueville - It has served Classe préparatoire aux grandes écoles (CPGE) students since the northern hemisphere autumn of 1999
 Boarding dormitory ("L'internat")
 "Palais des sciences" - The science building
 Salle des Empereurs

Notable alumni
 René Haby
 Sam Hocevar
 Louis Joxe
 Jean-Victor Poncelet
 Robert Schuman
 Alexis de Tocqueville
 Joachim von Ribbentrop

Further reading
 Cordani, Aline.(2006) Le Lycée Fabert, 200 ans d’histoire. Serpenoise,

References

External links

 Lycée Fabert

Fabert
Schools in Metz